This article presents a list of the historical events and publications of Australian literature during 1938.

Books 

 Martin Boyd – Night of the Party
 Eleanor Dark – Waterway
 Jean Devanny – Paradise Flow
 Arthur Gask – The Fall of a Dictator
 Xavier Herbert – Capricornia
 Michael Innes – Lament for a Maker
 Norman Lindsay – Age of Consent
 Alice Grant Rosman – Unfamiliar Faces
 Nevil Shute – Ruined City
 Christina Stead – House of All Nations
 E. V. Timms – Maelstrom
 Arthur Upfield – The Bone is Pointed

Short stories 

 Alan Marshall – "Clarkey's Dead"
 Katharine Susannah Prichard – "Marlene"

Poetry 

 R. D. FitzGerald – Moonlight Acre
 A. D. Hope – "Standardisation"
 Jack Moses – Nine Miles from Gundagai
 John Shaw Neilson
 Beauty Imposes : Some Recent Verse
 "The Crane is My Neighbour"
 Rosemary Dobson – Poems
 Jack Lindsay – "On Guard for Spain"

Awards and honours

Literary

Births 

A list, ordered by date of birth (and, if the date is either unspecified or repeated, ordered alphabetically by surname) of births in 1938 of Australian literary figures, authors of written works or literature-related individuals follows, including year of death.

 10 March – Tony Morphett, scriptwriter (died 2018)
 28 July – Robert Hughes, critic (died 2012)
 21 August – Mudrooroo, novelist, poet and playwright (died 2019)
 17 October – Les Murray, poet (died 2019)
 30 October – Morris Lurie, novelist (died 2014)
 21 December – Frank Moorhouse, novelist (died 2022)

Deaths 

A list, ordered by date of death (and, if the date is either unspecified or repeated, ordered alphabetically by surname) of deaths in 1938 of Australian literary figures, authors of written works or literature-related individuals follows, including year of birth.

 21 January – Will Dyson, poet and artist (born 1880)
7 February – Constance Le Plastrier, writer, schoolteacher and botanist (born 1864)
 22 June – C. J. Dennis, poet (born 1876)

See also 
 1938 in poetry
 List of years in literature
 List of years in Australian literature
 1938 in literature
 1937 in Australian literature
 1938 in Australia
 1939 in Australian literature

References

Literature
Australian literature by year
20th-century Australian literature